Honganasu is a 2008 Indian Kannada-language romance film written and directed by Ratnaja of Nenapirali fame. The film stars Prem Kumar in lead role whereas debutant Anjali and Anuradha Mehta play the female leads. Ananth Nag plays a very important role in the film.

The film is produced by Nenapirali Movies.

Cast
 Prem Kumar as Sagar
 Anjali as Impana
 Anuradha Mehta as Sowmya
 Ananth Nag
 Vinaya Prasad
 Ramesh Bhat
 Naveen Krishna
 Sharan
 Chitra Shenoy
 Shobharaj as Gounder Gowda
 Adarsha as Santosh
 Jayashri Raj as Shilpa

Track list

References

External links 
 
 Review
 Rediff review
 Honganasu at Raaga

2008 films
2000s Kannada-language films
Films scored by Hamsalekha